Basma Emad Gouda Mohamed Ibrahim (born 27 June 1995) is an Egyptian weightlifter. She is a two-time silver medalist at the African Games.

Career  

She won the bronze medals in the women's 48kg Snatch and Clean & Jerk events at the 2013 Mediterranean Games held in Mersin, Turkey. In 2014, she competed in the women's 53kg event at the World Weightlifting Championships held in Almaty, Kazakhstan. She also competed in the women's 53kg event at the 2015 World Weightlifting Championships held in Houston, United States.

She won the silver medal in the women's 59kg event at the 2019 African Games held in Rabat, Morocco. She won the bronze medal in the women's 59kg Clean & Jerk event at the 2022 Mediterranean Games held in Oran, Algeria.

Achievements

References

External links 
 

Living people
1995 births
Place of birth missing (living people)
Egyptian female weightlifters
African Weightlifting Championships medalists
African Games medalists in weightlifting
African Games silver medalists for Egypt
Competitors at the 2015 African Games
Competitors at the 2019 African Games
Competitors at the 2013 Mediterranean Games
Competitors at the 2022 Mediterranean Games
Mediterranean Games bronze medalists for Egypt
Mediterranean Games medalists in weightlifting
21st-century Egyptian women